Sellam Nethnam Lellam is a 2017 Sri Lankan Sinhala comedy, family film directed by Tissa Dias and co-produced by Mangala Madugalla and Piyumika Wijeratne for Sathjaya Films. It stars Jayasekara Aponso, and director Tissa Dias in lead roles along with Wimal Kumara de Costa and Mercy Edirisinghe. According to the producer Mangala Madugalla, the film finished its production four years ago, however with the competition to release the film, it took four years to screen the film. It is the 1286th Sri Lankan film in the Sinhala cinema. This is the last film of popular TV actor Srilal Abeykoon before his death on 16 April 2020.

Plot

Cast
 Jayasekara Aponso as Robaa
 Tissa Dias as Obaa
 Wimal Kumara de Costa
 Mercy Edirisinghe
 Harry Wimalasena
 Chanchala Warnasuriya
 Ronnie Leitch
 Jeevan Handunnetti
 Premadasa Withanage
 Manel Wanaguru
 Miyuri Samarasinghe
 Srilal Abeykoon

References

2017 films
2010s Sinhala-language films